Caer Drewyn is an early Iron Age hillfort to the north of the town of Corwen, Denbighshire (Grid reference ). It has a large stone rampart with entrances on the west and north sides; there is a guard chamber within the north-east entrance, and it has a deep  defensive ditch.

The site
Caer Drewyn is the most southerly hillfort in the Clwydian Range and Dee Valley Area of Outstanding Natural Beauty. It is situated on the spur of a hill between Llangollen and Corwen, just above the confluence of the River Dee and the River Alwen. The earliest structure was a small enclosure built against a natural rock outcrop. Today this structure is only visible as the remains of a grass-covered bank. A later, larger fortress was surrounded by a dry-stone wall, and does not have the earthen ramparts of other local hillforts. The area of the site is about three hectares. There are two in-turned entrances, one at the highest point, with the possible remains of a guardhouse beside it, and the other on the west side adjoining the remains of a rectangular building. There is a further enclosure outside that contains stone foundations of what may have been a hut platform.

History
Caer Drewyn is an Iron Age fort dating back to about 500 BC, however it was in use as a defensive position long after this. Legend states that Owain Gwynedd occupied it while Henry II of England was invading Gwynedd in 1165 via a southerly route, and Owain Glyndŵr is believed to have gathered his troops here in 1400 after his followers proclaimed him Prince of Wales. The Welsh antiquarian Edward Lhuyd mentioned Caer Drewyn in the late seventeenth century as "a place where they kept their cattle in war time".

See also
List of hillforts in Wales

References

Hillforts in Denbighshire
Corwen